Dennis Charlton was an association football player who represented New Zealand at international level.

Charlton played three official A-international matches for New Zealand in 1954, all against trans-Tasman neighbours Australia, the first a 2–1 win on 14 August, followed by consecutive 1–4 losses on 28 August and 4 September respectively.

References 

Year of birth missing
Year of death missing
New Zealand association footballers
New Zealand international footballers
Association footballers not categorized by position